Nugzar Asatiani (16 July 1937 – 2 April 1992) was a Soviet fencer. He won a gold medal in the team sabre event at the 1964 Summer Olympics.

References

1937 births
1992 deaths
People from Imereti
Svan people
Soviet male sabre fencers
Olympic fencers of the Soviet Union
Male sabre fencers from Georgia (country)
Fencers at the 1960 Summer Olympics
Fencers at the 1964 Summer Olympics
Olympic gold medalists for the Soviet Union
Olympic medalists in fencing
Medalists at the 1964 Summer Olympics
Universiade medalists in fencing
Universiade silver medalists for the Soviet Union
Medalists at the 1961 Summer Universiade